2,N,N-trimethyltryptamine, 2,N,N-TMT, or 2-Me-DMT is a tryptamine derivative that is a psychedelic drug. It was invented by Alexander Shulgin and reported in his book TiHKAL (#34). It is claimed to show psychoactive effects at a dosage of 50–100 mg orally, but these are relatively mild compared to other similar drugs, suggesting that while the 2-methyl group has blocked the binding of metabolic enzymes, it is also interfering with binding to the 5HT2A receptor target that mediates the hallucinogenic effects of these drugs.

Legal status 
Sweden's public health agency suggested classifying 2-Me-DMT as a hazardous substance, on May 15, 2019.

See also
 5,N,N-TMT
 7,N,N-TMT

References

External links 
 2-Me-DMT entry in TiHKAL • info

Psychedelic tryptamines
Dimethylamino compounds